The local conference of bishops is the Episcopal Conference of Togo (French: Episcopal Conférence du Togo, CET).

The CET is a member of the Regional Bishops' Conference of Francophone West Africa and Symposium of Episcopal Conferences of Africa and Madagascar (SECAM).

List of Presidents:
1970–1992: Robert-Casimir Tonyui Messan Dosseh-Anyron, Archbishop of Lomé
1992–2006: Philippe Fanoko Kossi Kpodzro, Archbishop of Lomé
2006–....: Ambrose Kotamba Djoliba, bishop of Sokodé

External links
 http://www.gcatholic.org/dioceses/country/TG.htm
 http://www.catholic-hierarchy.org/country/tg.html

Togo
Catholic Church in Togo

it:Chiesa cattolica in Togo#Conferenza episcopale